The 1942–43 Western Kentucky State Teachers Hilltoppers men's basketball team represented Western Kentucky State Normal School and Teachers College(now known as Western Kentucky University) during the 1942-43 NCAA basketball season. The team was led by future Naismith Memorial Basketball Hall of Fame coach Edgar Diddle and Helms Foundation All-American center Oran McKinney.   The Hilltoppers won the Kentucky Intercollegiate Athletic Conference championship and were invited to the 1943 National Invitation Tournament.  During this period, the NIT was considered to be the premiere college basketball tournament, with the winner being recognized as the national champion.
Dero Downing and Wallace “Buck” Sydnor were team captains and Don “Duck” Ray led the team in scoring.  There were several military teams on Western Kentucky's schedule, which was not uncommon during World War II.

Schedule

|-
!colspan=6| Regular Season

|-

 

|-
!colspan=6| 1943 Kentucky Intercollegiate Athletic Conference Tournament

|-
!colspan=6| 1943 National Invitation Tournament

References

Western Kentucky Hilltoppers basketball seasons
Western Kentucky State Teachers
Western Kentucky State Teachers